is a passenger railway station located in the city of Izumiōtsu, Osaka Prefecture, Japan, operated by the private railway operator Nankai Electric Railway. It has the station number "NK19".

Lines

Layout
The station consists of two elevated opposed side platforms with the station building underneath.

Platforms

Adjacent stations

History
It was renamed to its present name on 15 December 1960.

Passenger statistics
In fiscal 2019, the station was used by an average of 3944 passengers daily.

Surrounding area
 Osaka Prefectural Museum of Yayoi Culture

See also
 List of railway stations in Japan

References

External links

  

Railway stations in Japan opened in 1914
Railway stations in Osaka Prefecture
Izumiōtsu